Yakatarla is a village in the Ovacık District, Tunceli Province, Turkey. The village is populated by Kurds of the Kalan tribe and had a population of 36 in 2021.

The hamlets of Esenyurt, Koruklu, Örenönü, Terazin, Yarpuzlu and Yeşilyurt are attached to the village.

References 

Kurdish settlements in Tunceli Province
Villages in Ovacık District